Eirenis punctatolineatus is a species of snake of the family Colubridae. It is commonly known as the dotted dwarf racer.

Geographic range
The snake is found in the Middle East.

References 

Eirenis
Reptiles described in 1892
Reptiles of the Middle East